The field of social medicine seeks to implement social care through
 understanding how social and economic conditions impact health, disease and the practice of medicine and
 fostering conditions in which this understanding can lead to a healthier society.

Social medicine as a scientific field gradually began in the early 19th century, the Industrial Revolution and the subsequent increase in poverty and disease among workers raised concerns about the effect of social processes on the health of the poor. The field of social medicine is most commonly addressed today by public health efforts to understand what are known as social determinants of health.

Scope
The major emphasis on biomedical science in medical education, health care, and medical research has resulted into a gap with our understanding and acknowledgement of far more important social determinants of public health and individual disease: social-economic inequalities, war, illiteracy, detrimental life-styles (smoking, obesity), discrimination because of race, gender and religion. Farmer et al. (2006) gave the following explanation for this gap:

The holy grail of modern medicine remains the search for a molecular basis of disease. While the practical yield of such circumscribed inquiry has been enormous, exclusive focus on molecular-level phenomena has contributed to the increasing "desocialization" of scientific inquiry: a tendency to ask only biological questions about what are in fact biosocial phenomena.

They further concluded that "Biosocial understandings of medical phenomena are urgently needed".

Social care
Social care traditionally takes a different look at issues of impairment and disability by adopting a holistic perspective on health. The social model was developed as a direct response to the medical model, the social model sees barriers (physical, attitudinal and behavioural) not just as a biomedical issue, but as caused in part by the society we live in – as a product of the physical, organizational and social worlds that lead to discrimination (Oliver 1996; French 1993; Oliver and Barnes 1993). Social care advocates equality of opportunities for vulnerable sections of society.

History
German physician Rudolf Virchow (1821–1902) laid foundations for this model. Other prominent figures in the history of social medicine, beginning from the 20th century, include Salvador Allende, Henry E. Sigerist, Thomas McKeown, Victor W. Sidel, Howard Waitzkin, and more recently Paul Farmer and Jim Yong Kim.

In The Second Sickness, Waitzkin traces the history of social medicine from Engels, through Virchow and Allende.  Waitzkin has sought to educate North Americans about the contributions of Latin American Social Medicine.

In 1976, the British public health scientist and health care critic Thomas McKeown, MD, published "The role of medicine: Dream, mirage or nemesis?", wherein he summarized facts and arguments that supported what became known as McKeown's thesis, i.e. that the growth of population can be attributed to a decline in mortality from infectious diseases, primarily thanks to better nutrition, later also to better hygiene, and only marginally and late to medical interventions such as antibiotics and vaccines. McKeown was heavily criticized for his controversial ideas, but is nowadays remembered as "the founder of social medicine".

See also

 Epidemiology
 Medical anthropology
 Medical sociology
 Social determinants of health in poverty
 Social epidemiology
 Social psychology
 Socialized medicine
 Society for Social Medicine

References

Bibliography
Social Medicine: http://journals.sfu.ca/socialmedicine/index.php/socialmedicine/index
Social Medicine Portal: http://www.socialmedicine.org/

Matthew R. Anderson, Lanny Smith, and Victor W. Sidel. What is Social Medicine?  Monthly Review: 56(8). http://www.monthlyreview.org/0105anderson.htm
King NMP, Strauss RP, Churchill LR, Estroff SE, Henderson GE, et al. editors (2005) Patients, doctors, and illness. Volume I: The social medicine reader 2nd edition Durham: Duke University Press.
Henderson GE, Estroff SE, Churchill LR, King NMP, Oberlander J, et al. editors (2005) Social and cultural contributions to health, difference, and inequality. Volume II: The social medicine reader 2nd edition Durham: Duke University Press.
Oberlander J, Churchill LR, Estroff SE, Henderson GE, King NMP, et al. editors (2005) Health policy, markets, and medicine. Volume III: The social medicine reader 2nd edition Durham: Duke University Press.

External links 
 Introduction to the journal: Social Medicine
 What is social medicine?

Anthropology
Determinants of health
Medical terminology
History of medicine
Medical sociology
Public health
Social philosophy